The 2003 Baltimore Orioles season involved the Orioles finishing 4th in the American League East with a record of 71 wins and 91 losses.

Offseason
December 2, 2002: Bill Pulsipher was signed as a free agent with the Baltimore Orioles.
January 3, 2003: Omar Daal was signed as a free agent with the Baltimore Orioles.
March 7, 2003: B. J. Surhoff was signed as a free agent with the Baltimore Orioles.

Steve Bechler
On February 16, 2003, towards the beginning of Orioles' spring training camp in Fort Lauderdale, Florida, Steve Bechler collapsed while participating in conditioning drills. He was rushed to a nearby hospital, and died the next day. His body temperature had reached . An autopsy performed by Dr. Joshua Perper, a toxicologist, concluded that his death was caused by "'abnormal liver function and mild hypertension', his weight problem (he weighed 230 pounds and was exercising hard, the fact that he was not used to south Florida's warm weather and the toxicity of ephedra. He was using the supplement ephedra, against the advice of his trainer, and probably had not eaten in two days in an effort to lose weight.

Regular season

Season standings

Record vs. opponents

Transactions
 June 3, 2003: Nick Markakis was drafted by the Baltimore Orioles in the 1st round (7th pick) of the 2003 amateur draft. Player signed June 11, 2003.
 July 25, 2003: Sean Spencer was signed as a free agent with the Baltimore Orioles.

Roster

Player stats

Batting

Starters by position 
Note: Pos = Position; G = Games played; AB = At bats; H = Hits; Avg. = Batting average; HR = Home runs; RBI = Runs batted in

Other batters
Note: G = Games played; AB = At bats; H = Hits; Avg. = Batting average; HR = Home runs; RBI = Runs batted in

Pitching

Starting pitchers 
Note: G = Games pitched; IP = Innings pitched; W = Wins; L = Losses; ERA = Earned run average; SO = Strikeouts

Other pitchers 
Note: G = Games pitched; IP = Innings pitched; W = Wins; L = Losses; ERA = Earned run average; SO = Strikeouts

Relief pitchers 
Note: G = Games pitched; W = Wins; L = Losses; SV = Saves; ERA = Earned run average; SO = Strikeouts

Farm system

References

2003 Baltimore Orioles team page at Baseball Reference
2003 Baltimore Orioles season at baseball-almanac.com

Baltimore Orioles seasons
Baltimore Orioles Season, 2003
Baltimore